Bitter Ending is a recording of a work for eight voices composed by Andre Hodeir as commissioned by Ward Swingle. The work is performed by the Swingle Singers with a jazz quintet. This was the last work by Hodeir and is inspired by James Joyce's Finnegans Wake

Personnel
Roger Guérin – trumpet
Pierre Gossez – saxophone
Jean-Louis Chautemps – saxophone
Jacques (Jacky) Cavallero – double bass
Marcel Sabiani – drums
The Swingle Singers:
Christiane Legrand – soprano
Nicole Darde – soprano
Hélène Devos – alto
Claudine Meunier – alto
Ward Swingle – tenor, arranger
Joseph Noves – tenor
Jean Cussac – bass
José Germain – bass

References / external links

Epic 80544

1972 albums
Epic Records albums
Finnegans Wake
The Swingle Singers albums